"From Where to Eternity" is the 22nd episode of the HBO original series The Sopranos and the ninth of the show's second season. It was written by Michael Imperioli and directed by Henry J. Bronchtein, and originally aired on March 12, 2000.

Starring
 James Gandolfini as Tony Soprano
 Lorraine Bracco as Dr. Jennifer Melfi
 Edie Falco as Carmela Soprano
 Michael Imperioli as Christopher Moltisanti
 Dominic Chianese as Corrado Soprano, Jr. *
 Vincent Pastore as Big Pussy Bonpensiero
 Steven Van Zandt as Silvio Dante
 Tony Sirico as Paulie Gualtieri
 Robert Iler as Anthony Soprano, Jr.
 Jamie-Lynn Sigler as Meadow Soprano
 Drea de Matteo as Adriana La Cerva
 David Proval as Richie Aprile
 Aida Turturro as Janice Soprano
 Nancy Marchand as Livia Soprano *

* = credit only

Guest starring
 Jerry Adler as Hesh Rabkin

Also guest starring

Synopsis
Christopher is in the hospital after being shot.  He is clinically dead for about a minute and his spleen is removed, but he survives. Conscious but heavily medicated with morphine, he asks to see Tony and Paulie. He tells them he went to hell and saw Brendan Filone and Mikey Palmice; he also saw his father, who gets killed again every night. He reports that Filone and Palmice had a message for Tony and Paulie: "Three o'clock."

Tony comforts him, assuring him it was only a dream. Discussing Chris' experience with Dr. Melfi, Tony says he does not think he or Chris will go to Hell. He explains: "Soldiers don't go to Hell ... everybody involved knows the stakes and ... you gotta do certain things. It's business. We're soldiers."

Paulie, however, is deeply disturbed. He tries to persuade Chris it was only purgatory, not Hell, but still has nightmares about it. On his girlfriend's advice, he seeks the help of a psychic, who appears to have a terrifying knowledge of Paulie's past, including the name of the first man he ever killed, thirty years ago. Paulie complains to his priest that all of the donations he has made to the church should have given him immunity; he will not donate anymore.

Pussy has a bad-tempered meeting with Skip Lipari. He tells him nothing but repeats his fear that Tony suspects him. An informer on the street tells him where Matt Bevilaqua is hiding, and he and Tony go there together. Tony questions Matt, establishing that Richie had no part in the attempt to kill Christopher, then shoots him. He glances at Pussy, who shoots him too, and they empty their guns into the lifeless body. They have dinner in a familiar restaurant and talk nostalgically of old times.

While Chris is near death, Carmela finds an empty hospital room with a crucifix and prays for him. When he is conscious, she tells him he has been given a second chance, but as they speak she realizes Tony lied when he told her that Chris dreamed of going to Heaven.

The women are gossiping about an associate of the Sopranos whose long-term comàre has had his child. Dreading the shame if such a thing happened to her own family, Carmela asks Tony to have a vasectomy. He vigorously refuses, and when he assures her that he has had his girlfriend tested for AIDS she leaves their bed in revulsion. Later, having reconsidered, he tells her he will consent, but to his bafflement, she has changed her mind. She says, "All I want is you. That's all I have ever wanted," and makes passionate love to him.

First appearance
Joanne Moltisanti: the widow of Richard Moltisanti and Christopher Moltisanti's mother. Played by the first of 2 actresses to play the role.

Deceased
Matthew Bevilaqua: Riddled with bullets by Tony and Pussy for his involvement in the attempted assassination of Christopher.

Title reference
The episode's title is a play on the film From Here to Eternity (1953). It also refers to Christopher's taking a trip to the afterlife and not knowing whether it was purgatory or hell.

Production
 In his dream, Christopher describes how Mikey Palmice and Brendan Filone claimed that the time three o'clock would be important in the lives of Tony and Paulie. 
 This is the second one of four episodes directed by Henry Bronchtein, as well as one of two which earned Bronchtein best-direction nominations by the Directors Guild of America. 
 In his commentary for the episode "The Telltale Moozadell", Michael Imperioli says the idea of Christopher's experiences in this episode came from a spec script he had written between the first and second seasons about Christopher overdosing on drugs and having an after-life experience. When he talked to showrunner David Chase about this, Chase said that Christopher would get shot in the second season, and the after-life part could be added to the story.

Cultural references
 Tony tells Melfi the Hitlers and Pol Pots deserve hell and not people like Christopher. He also mentions America's need for Italian immigrants to "build cities and dig subways and to make them richer." He explains that the Carnegie and Rockefeller families needed "worker bees" (Italian immigrant workers), but some didn't want to "lose who we were, and preserve the things that meant to us: honor and family and loyalty". He says the J. P. Morgans were "crooks and killers too, but that's a business right, the American way."
 Carmela is seen reading Memoirs of a Geisha in bed in this and several succeeding episodes.
 Tony refers to the psychic as a Ghostbuster.
 A.J. is seen playing the Game Boy Color game Pokémon Pinball.

Music
 Otis Redding's "My Lover's Prayer" (from Complete & Unbelievable: The Otis Redding Dictionary of Soul) is played throughout the episode and over the end credits (specifically, when Christopher is in the hospital, when his friends and family wait in the hospital waiting room while Chris is in surgery, and over the end credits when Tony and Carmela make love).
 The O'Jays' song "Use ta Be My Girl", from So Full of Love, is played when Quickie G tells Pussy where Matthew Bevilaqua is hiding.
 The Metallica song "King Nothing", from Load, is played in the background while Paulie talks to Tony at the Bada Bing! after he visits the psychic.
 The song "Mona Lisa" is heard in the background at the Duke's Stockyard Inn (an Irish bar and restaurant) where Tony and Pussy eat steaks, reminisce, and discuss God.

Filming locations 
Listed in order of first appearance:

 Harrison, New Jersey
 North Caldwell, New Jersey
 Satriale's Pork Store in Kearny, New Jersey
 Paramus, New Jersey

External links
"From Where to Eternity"  at HBO

References

The Sopranos (season 2) episodes
2000 American television episodes

fr:Saison 2 des Soprano#Épisode 9 : Affaire d'éternité